Wilton is a historic plantation house located near Wilton, Middlesex County, Virginia.  It was constructed in 1763, and is a -story, "T"-shaped brick dwelling, with a five bay front section and four bay rear ell.  The front portion of the house is covered with a gambrel roof and the rear with a hip-on-hip roof.

It was listed on the National Register of Historic Places in 1979.

References

Plantation houses in Virginia
Houses on the National Register of Historic Places in Virginia
Houses completed in 1763
Houses in Middlesex County, Virginia
National Register of Historic Places in Middlesex County, Virginia